Abram Stevens Hewitt (July 31, 1822January 18, 1903) was an American politician, educator, ironmaking industrialist, and lawyer who was mayor of New York City for two years from 1887 to 1888.

The son-in-law of the industrialist and philanthropist Peter Cooper, Hewitt is best known for his work with the Cooper Union, which he aided Cooper in founding in 1859, and for planning the financing and construction of the first line of what would eventually develop into the New York City Subway, for which he is considered the "Father of the New York City Subway System".

Early life 
Hewitt was born in Haverstraw, New York. His mother, Ann Gurnee, was of French Huguenot descent, while his father, John Hewitt, was from Staffordshire in England and had emigrated to the U.S. in 1796 to work on a steam engine to power a water plant in Philadelphia.

Hewitt earned a scholarship to attend Columbia College. After graduating from the College in 1842, he taught mathematics there, and became a lawyer several years later.

From 1843 to 1844, Hewitt traveled to Europe with his student, Edward Cooper, the son of industrialist entrepreneur Peter Cooper, and another future New York City mayor. During their return voyage, the pair were shipwrecked together. After this, Hewitt became "virtually a member of the Cooper family", and in 1855 married Edward's sister, Sarah Amelia.

Career 
In 1845, financed by Peter Cooper, Hewitt and Edward Cooper started an iron mill in Trenton, New Jersey, the Trenton Iron Company, where, in 1854, they produced the first structural wrought iron beams, as well as developing other innovative products. Hewitt's younger brother, Charles, was a manager at the iron mill. Hewitt also invested in other companies, in many case serving on their boards. Hewitt was known for dedicated work for the U.S. government and exceptionally good relations with his employees.

After his marriage to Sarah Cooper, Hewitt supervised the construction of the Cooper Union, Peter Cooper's free educational institution, and chaired its board of trustees until 1903.

Political career
In 1871, inspired by reformer Samuel J. Tilden, Cooper prominently campaigned to remove the corrupt "Tweed Ring", led by William M. "Boss" Tweed, from control of Tammany Hall, and to reorganize the Democratic Party in New York, which Tweed controlled for years through his political machine. Hewitt first ventured into electoral politics in 1874, when he won a seat in the U.S. House of Representatives, where he initially served two terms representing , from March 4, 1875 to March 3, 1879. During his first stint in Congress, he was made head of the Democratic National Committee in 1876, when Tilden ran unsuccessfully for President. After defeating James O'Brien, his successor in Congress who was a staunch opponent of Tammany Hall, for the Democratic nomination in the 10th district during the 1880 elections, Hewitt regained his old seat and once again served in the U.S. House from March 4, 1881 to December 30, 1886.

Hewitt's most famous speech was made at the opening of the Brooklyn Bridge between Manhattan and Brooklyn in 1883.

Hewitt was elected mayor of New York in the 1886 election when Richard Croker of Tammany Hall–– which had resumed its control of the city Democratic Party–– arranged for Hewitt to win the Democratic nomination with Tammany Hall's support, despite his being the leader of the anti-Tammany "Swallowtails" of the party. Croker needed a strong candidate to oppose the United Labor Party candidate, political economist Henry George, as Tammany feared that a win by George might reorganize politics in the city along class lines rather than along ethnic lines, which Tammany exploited to stay in power.

Hewitt may have held nativist beliefs: he refused, for instance, to review the Saint Patrick's Day parade, a decision that alienated much of the Democratic Party's Irish–American base in the city. Hewitt also refused to allow Tammany the control of patronage they wanted, and Croker saw to it that Hewittt was not nominated for a second term.

Hewitt was considered a defender of sound money practices (he is quoted as saying "Unnecessary taxation is unjust taxation") and civil service reform. He developed a plan to fund and construct the New York City Subway system.

A 1993 survey of historians, political scientists and urban experts conducted by Melvin G. Holli of the University of Illinois at Chicago ranked Hewitt as the twenty-sixth-best American big-city mayor to have served between the years 1820 and 1993.

Entrepreneurial career
Hewitt had many investments in natural resources, including considerable holdings in West Virginia, where William Nelson Page (1854–1932) was one of his managers. He was also an associate of Henry Huttleston Rogers (1840–1909), a financier and industrialist who was a key man in the Standard Oil Trust, and a major developer of natural resources. One of Hewitt's investments handled by Rogers and Page was the Loup Creek Estate in Fayette County, West Virginia. The Deepwater Railway was a subsidiary initially formed by the Loup Creek investors to ship bituminous coal from coal mines on their land a short distance to the main line of the Chesapeake and Ohio Railway (C&O) along the Kanawha River. After rate disputes, the tiny short line railroad was eventually expanded to extend all the way into Virginia and across that state to a new coal pier at Sewell's Point on Hampton Roads. Planned secretly right under the noses of the large railroads, it was renamed the Virginian Railway, and was also known as the "richest little railroad in the world" for much of the 20th century.

In 1890, Abram partnered with Edward Cooper and Hamilton M. Twombly in forming the American Sulphur Company, which then entered into a 50/50 agreement with Herman Frasch and his partners to form the Union Sulphur Company.

Philanthropy
As a philanthropist, Hewitt was especially interested in education. Columbia University gave him the degree of LL.D. in 1887, and he was the president of its alumni association in 1883, and a trustee from 1901 until his death. In 1876, he was elected president of the American Institute of Mining Engineers, and was a founder and trustee of the Carnegie Institution of Science. He was also a trustee of Barnard College and of the American Museum of Natural History.

Death and family

Abram Hewitt died at his New York City home on January 18, 1903, and was interred at Green-Wood Cemetery. His last words, after he took his oxygen tube from his mouth, were "And now, I am officially dead."

Hewitt's daughters, Amy, Eleanor, and Sarah Hewitt, built a decorative arts collection that was for years exhibited at the Cooper Union and later became the core collection of the Cooper-Hewitt National Design Museum. His son, Peter Cooper Hewitt (1861–1921), was a successful inventor, while another son, Edward Ringwood Hewitt (1866–1957), was also an inventor, a chemist and an early expert on fly-fishing. He published Telling on the Trout, among other books.

Hewitt's youngest son, Erskine Hewitt (1871–1938), was also a lawyer and philanthropist in New York City. He donated Ringwood Manor to the State of New Jersey in 1936. On February 18, 1909, Erskine Hewitt was named a director of the newly formed National Reserve Bank of the City of New York. On March 2, 1909, Hewitt was elected chairman.

Legacy 

One of Cooper Union's academic buildings was named in his honor. It was demolished and replaced by 41 Cooper Square in 2007. An historic twenty-foot column in the Hewitt Building designed by Stanford White was transported—appropriately enough—to its former home at the Green-Wood Cemetery in Brooklyn, New York, where it now stands on Abram S. Hewitt's memorial plot.
A New York City fireboat, Abram S. Hewitt, which served from 1903 until 1958 was named in his honor. The fireboat was eventually scrapped, and its remains may be found at the Witte Marine Scrapyard in Rossville, Staten Island.
There is a life-sized white marble statue of Hewitt in the Great Hall of the Chamber of Commerce of the State of New York in Albany, New York.
The historic village of Hewitt, New Jersey, located within the Township of West Milford, is preserved within Long Pond Ironworks State Park. The village contains the ruins of the iron smelting furnaces operated by Cooper and Hewitt.
 Ringwood Manor in Ringwood, New Jersey, the Hewitt family's summer estate from 1857 to the 1930s, is preserved as the centerpiece of New Jersey's Ringwood State Park.
 Abram Stevens Hewitt School (P.S. 130) in the Bronx, New York, was named for him.
 Hewitt Hall of Barnard College at Columbia University is named for him.
Abram S. Hewitt State Forest along the Appalachian Trail was named in his honor.

References 
Notes

Bibliography

External links 

 

Hewitt, Abram Stevens
Hewitt, Abram Stevens
Hewitt, Abram Stevens
Hewitt, Abram Stevens
Hewitt, Abram Stevens
Hewitt, Abram Stevens
Peter Cooper
People from Haverstraw, New York
Democratic Party members of the United States House of Representatives from New York (state)
History of the New York City Subway
19th-century American politicians
Bourbon Democrats
Columbia University faculty
Members of the United States House of Representatives from New York (state)